The Arctic World Archive (AWA) is a facility for data preservation, located in the Svalbard archipelago on the island of Spitsbergen, Norway, not far from the Svalbard Global Seed Vault. It contains data of historical and cultural interest from several countries, as well as all of American multinational company GitHub's open source code, in a deeply buried steel vault, with the data storage medium expected to last for 500 to 1,000 years. It is run as a profit-making business by private company Piql and the state-owned coal-mining company Store Norske Spitsbergen Kulkompani (SNSK).

History
Piql is a  Norwegian data-storage company that specialises  in long-term storage of digital media. Piql and SNSK created the deeply buried steel vault out of a mineshaft of an abandoned coal mine. At the time of its opening as the Arctic World Archive on 27 March 2017, the Brazilian, Mexican and Norwegian governments deposited copies of various historical documents in the vault.

Description
The archive facility is on Spitsbergen, the biggest island in Svalbard.
 
The facility is secured with a concrete wall and a steel gate. The deposits themselves are stored in secure shipping containers behind the gate.

The vault is situated deeply enough to avoid damage even from nuclear and EMP weapons.

Storage and future use
Data is stored offline on film reels made using a refined version of ordinary darkroom photography technology. The film is made of polyester coated in silver halide crystals and powder-coated with iron oxide, and has a life span of at least 500 and possibly up to 2,000 years, if stored in optimum conditions.

The level of security of the data represents the "cold layer" of archiving. The "hot" (accessible online repositories) and "warm" (e.g. Internet Archive) layers both have the weakness of being founded upon electronics – both would be wiped out in a repeat of the 19th-century geomagnetic storm known as the "Carrington Event". It is an incomplete but more secure snapshot of data, with archiving intended at five-year intervals.

Realising that people in the very far future may not understand what they see in the vault, a kind of "Rosetta Stone"  has been devised to help decode the data, in the form of a guide to interpreting the archive. The guides are all readable by eye, after magnification, and written in English, Arabic, Spanish, Chinese, and Hindi.

Process
Clients, who pay for the storage of data, can send their data digitally or physically. The data can be retrieved at any time from the vault, but it is not a quick process, because the data is not connected to the internet. If data is requested, the relevant reel of film has to be manually retrieved, then uploaded via a fibre optic connection to the mainland, to Piql's headquarters in Drammen; the fastest possible retrieval time is 20–30 minutes, but it usually takes longer.

Contents
The archive stores a wide range of historical and cultural data. Governments, researchers, religious institutions, media companies and others store some of their most significant records in the vault; Brazil and Norway have archived their constitutions and other important historical papers.

The archive includes information about the biodiversity of Australia, and examples of culturally significant Australian works. It includes the Atlas of Living Australia, and machine learning models created by Geoscience Australia, which assist in understanding topics such as bushfires and climate change.

The archive includes a digitised version of the painting The Scream by Edvard Munch for the National Museum of Norway, and a digitised version of Dante's master-work of Italian literature, The Divine Comedy for the Vatican Library.

In March 2018, German science TV show Galileo deposited their first show, and made a documentary about it for ProSieben.

In October 2020, the first deposit from a Nobel Prize  laureate went to the Archive: 14 books of the 2018 Nobel Prize in Literature winner, Olga Tokarczuk, were placed on PiqlFilm, undertaken by the Piql Polska and funded by publisher Wydawnictwo Literackie.

GitHub Archive Program
In November 2019, GitHub (which was acquired by Microsoft in 2018) announced that all of its public open source code would be archived in a code vault at the Arctic World Archive, as part of its GitHub Archive Program.

In July 2020, the 21TB February site archive was stored at the AWA. The amount of code stored has been described thus: "If someone who types at about 60 words a minute sat down and tried to fill up all that space, it would take 111,300 years". The first reel holds the code of both the Linux and Android operating systems, plus that of 6,000 other major open source applications.

Further to the general guide to the vault, the "Tech Tree" details software development, programming languages and other information about computer programming. The Guide and the Tech Tree are written in a collaborative process as a public Git repository.

See also
Svalbard Global Seed Vault, which stores seeds from all over the world in case of large-scale crises
Internet Archive

References

External links
Martin Skjæraasen et al. "Frø i fare" [Seeds in danger] (22 March 2021) NRK

2017 establishments in Norway
Archives in Norway
Spitsbergen
Digital preservation